Humanity's End is a 2009 American fantasy science fiction film directed by Neil Johnson. Based upon a story concept by Johnson, and with a screenplay by Johnson and Michael Jonathan Smith, the film stars Jay Laisne, Rochelle Vallese and Cynthia Ickes.

Synopsis
Several hundred years into the future, mankind has been relegated to the position of a minority species being replaced by a clone-race called "Homo technis" or "Konstrukts" which is itself being supplanted by the genetically engineered race "Homo superior".  The Homo superior have enhanced themselves with DNA from a race of hostile extraterrestrials called Nephilim who are known for their superior military skills, to wipe out all the Homo sapiens and Homo technis "lesser" races from the galaxy. In order to save the "lower" races, Homo technis develops a genus of sapiens called "breeders", with an ability to bring multiple births to term quickly.

The Nephilim Homo superior manage to destroy all of Earth's "breeders", save one man and one woman. As a "breeder" himself, disgraced military man Derasi Vorde (Jay Laisne), has the duty of bringing the last female "breeder" from Earth to the safety of an off-world rebel base.

Cast
 Neil Johnson as Opening Narrator
 Jay Laisne as Derasi Vorde
 Rochelle Vallese as Contessa
 Cynthia Ickes as Alicia
 Kari Nissena as Gorlock
 Blake Edgerton as Statis Konstrukt 1
 Marc Scott Zicree as Statis Konstrukt 2
 William David Tulin as Sorgon 387
 Peta Johnson as Sheetak Declan (The Blue Whale)
 Don Baldaramos as General Freitag
 Joseph Darden as Roj-Junior
 James Canino as The Destroyer
 Maria Olsen as Sarah 419
 Bruce Douglas as Nephilim Priest
 Todd Justin as Nephilim Berserker
 Jak Fearon as Nephilim Field Commander
 John Alton as Nephilim Infiltrator
 Andrew Mallon as Nephilim Warrior #1
 Emmett Callinan as Nephilim Warrior #2
 Andrew Buist as Nephilim Aqua Warrior
 Amanda Walion as Robot Girl
 Pedro Cement as Deseri Vorde (in flashback as child)

Critical response
Quiet Earth praised the expectations created by release of the film trailer, writing they were "immediately blown away by what a SFX extravaganza it was shaping up to be," and that even if the CGI did not live up to expectations created by such as James Cameron's Avatar, the release of the film was anticipated.

DVD Talk made note the film suffered from low-quality CGI but, based upon its original film trailer, the concept appeared intriguing.  They offered that the film itself came off as an effort that appears to use parts of Serenity, post-modern Battlestar Galactica, mixed with old-school 1950s B-movie sci-fi, overstated machismo male characters, and an inventive intergalactic tech-speak, to create a product that is "unintentionally hilarious cinematic cheese".  In noted director Neil Johnson's love for "interstellar overdrives", they observed that he borrowed plot devices from such as Children of Men, The Hitchhiker's Guide to the Galaxy, and '50s B-movies, and how like Raul Gasteazoro did with 10,000 A.D.: The Legend of a Black Pearl and Cory McAbee with The American Astronaut, he created his own version of the future universe, and stuck to its constraints, even though his characters were caricatures, "no matter how irritating or aggravating."  They concluded that the result was "far from space junky", but that the director's single-mindedness gave a result which ended up "looking a bit silly." They gave him "kudos for being so brave" and "a few demerits for being so bafflingly brazen."

Home Media Magazine makes note that the film does not result in the destruction of humanity, but that the resemblance of the various forms of humans to one another adds to confusion for the viewer. They praised Jay Laisne as Derasi Vorde, writing his "Han Solo impressions will be enjoyed by sci-fi fans disappointed by Harrison Ford's appointment with the natural aging process".  They also approved of the film's focusing on the characters rather than the technology, offering that this created a science fiction story "that is above the norm."  They found flaw in the film's concentration on "petty drama between the characters" when the far more crucial battles of earth-humanity vs Nephilim is played out off camera and in the background.

Virtual DVD Magazine offered that the film would be appreciated by lovers of B-movie science fiction, but that its low-quality CGI visuals would require getting used to. They noted as a flaw, the film concentrating on characters to the exclusion of the backstory, in that in omitting the battles between humanity and the Nephilim, the film did not give viewers as much as it could have.

References

External links
 Official website
 

2009 films
2009 independent films
2009 science fiction action films
American science fiction action films
American independent films
American dystopian films
Films set in the future
American post-apocalyptic films
American pregnancy films
2000s English-language films
2000s American films